Feldwebel Karl-Heinz Meltzer (also known as Karlheinz) (23 February 1922 – August 1943) was a German fighter ace of World War II. He was born in Hamburg, served in the Luftwaffe on the Eastern front and was presumed killed in action in August 1943.

Career
Karl-Heinz Meltzer was born on 23 February 1922 in Hamburg. He served in the Luftwaffe (German Air Force) during the Second World War and is credited as one of their most successful fighter aces.

Early service

Following compulsory service in the Reicharbeitsdienst (German Labour Corps) in Northern Germany he enlisted in the Luftwaffe and trained as a fighter pilot. After pre-operational training at Ergänzungsjagdgruppe Ost (Training Fighter Wing – East) in the spring of 1942 during which he survived a major crash, he was transferred on 28 July 1942 as an Unteroffizier to 8./Jagdgeschwader 52 (JG 52—52nd Fighter Wing) flying near Rostov on the Eastern Front. This squadron was commanded by Günther Rall, the third most successful fighter pilot in history.

Operational service

Flying to the east of Mount Elbrus on 24 August 1942 Meltzer scored his first victory when he shot down a Russian Pe-2 fast light bomber. Between 21 September 1942 and 12 October 1942 in the same general area of operations he shot down 7 more Russian fighters and one Ilyushin-2 Stormovik ground attack bomber, and was belatedly awarded the Iron Cross 2nd Class and also the Iron Cross 1st Class.

Between 30 October and 5 November 1942 Meltzer shot down 7 more Russian fighters, bringing his score to 16 confirmed victories.
Flying over the Crimea between 24 March 1943 and 28 May 1943 Meltzer shot down 10 Russian fighters, including two Supermarine Spitfires provided to the Russian air forces by the British, bringing his score to 26 victories.

His unit moved to the Kharkov area in preparation for the Battle of Kursk, and, in flying operations between 4 and 12 July 1943, Meltzer shot down fourteen Russian aircraft, including 4 victories during four different missions on 5 July, one of which was the 2,500th victory of his parent unit the III Gruppe/JG 52. He also shot down 3 Russian aircraft in two missions on 6 July, one of which was his own 34th victory and counted as the 800th scored by his squadron, 8. Staffel. During combat above the enormous tank Battle of Kursk he flew several times as wingman to the commander of III. Gruppe of JG 52  Major Günther Rall. and also to Leutnant Friedrich Obleser now in command of 8. Staffel.

In the last two weeks of July his unit flew from bases further north near Orel, where he shot down more Russian aircraft before they moved south again to the Kharkov area; his 50th victory in early August 1943 was acknowledged as the 850th victory of 8 Staffel.  John Weal in More Bf 109 Aces of the Russian Front states that “in the eleven days thereafter Meltzer was credited with 24 more (victories), taking his total to 74 before he was himself shot down near Kharkov on 14 August”.

Meltzer was shot down in combat over Russian-occupied territory, and, like many German aces, he was never seen again.

During his career Karlheinz Meltzer flew over 180 missions, and was credited with 74 aerial victories; of these 61 were confirmed, 4 were unconfirmed and 9 were in conjunction with his wingman, and he proposed that the score count to the credit of the junior pilot rather than his own (the Luftwaffe did not allow shared victories).

See also
List of World War II flying aces

Awards
 Aviator badge (December 1941)
 Front Flying Clasp of the Luftwaffe in Gold (28 January 1943)
 Ehrenpokal der Luftwaffe (9 August 1943)
 Iron Cross (1939)
 2nd Class (9 October 1942)
 1st Class (27 October 1942)
 Ehrenpokal on 9 August 1943 as Unteroffizier  and pilot in a Jagdgeschwader  Award also recorded as Unteroffizier and pilot in the 8./Jagdgeschwader 52 
 German Cross in Gold on 6 December 1943 as Unteroffizier in the 8./Jagdgeschwader 52  Award also recorded as Unteroffizier in a Jagdgeschwader

References

Citations

Bibliography

 
 
 
 
 
 
 
 

 

1922 births
1943 deaths
Military personnel from Hamburg
German World War II flying aces
Luftwaffe pilots
Recipients of the Gold German Cross
Luftwaffe personnel killed in World War II